Baron Lamington, of Lamington in the County of Lanark, was a title in the Peerage of the United Kingdom. It was created in 1880 for Alexander Baillie-Cochrane, a long-standing Conservative Member of Parliament and old friend of Benjamin Disraeli. He was the son of Admiral of the Fleet Sir Thomas John Cochrane, son of Admiral the Honourable Sir Alexander Cochrane, sixth son of Thomas Cochrane, 8th Earl of Dundonald (see the Earl of Dundonald for earlier history of the Cochrane family). Lord Lamington was succeeded by his son, the second Baron. He represented St Pancras North in the House of Commons and served as Governor of Queensland and of Bombay. On his death the title passed to his son, the third Baron. He was childless and on his death in 1951 the barony became extinct. The Lamington cake is said to be named after the second baron.

Barons Lamington (1880)
Alexander Dundas Ross Cochrane-Wishart-Baillie, 1st Baron Lamington (1816–1890)
Charles Wallace Alexander Napier Ross Baillie-Cochrane, 2nd Baron Lamington (1860–1940)
Victor Alexander Brisbane William Cochrane-Baillie, 3rd Baron Lamington (1896–1951)

See also
Earl of Dundonald
Baron Cochrane of Cults

References

Sources

Kidd, Charles & Williamson, David (editors). Debrett's Peerage and Baronetage (1990 edition). New York: St Martin's Press, 1990, 

Extinct baronies in the Peerage of the United Kingdom
Cochrane family
Noble titles created in 1880
Noble titles created for UK MPs